Constantin Apostol (18 August 1903 – 1995) was a Romanian equestrian. He competed in two events at the 1936 Summer Olympics.

References

External links
 

1903 births
1995 deaths
Romanian male equestrians
Olympic equestrians of Romania
Equestrians at the 1936 Summer Olympics
People from Buzău
20th-century Romanian people